The Litterbug is a 1961 American animated short film produced by Walt Disney Productions and featuring Donald Duck. It was released on June 21, 1961, and was the last theatrical Donald Duck short to be produced.

Plot
Donald Duck is used as an example of various types of litterbugs who either consciously or unconsciously litter wherever they go.

Voice cast
 Narrator: John Dehner

Home media
The short was released on November 11, 2008, on Walt Disney Treasures: The Chronological Donald, Volume Four: 1951-1961.

References

External links 
 

1960s educational films
1961 short films
1961 animated films
Donald Duck short films
1960s Disney animated short films
Disney educational films
Films scored by Buddy Baker (composer)
Films directed by Hamilton Luske
Films produced by Walt Disney
1960s English-language films
American animated short films
Films about ducks